Echinolittorina interrupta is a species of sea snail, a marine gastropod mollusk in the family Littorinidae, the winkles or periwinkles.

Distribution

Description 
The maximum recorded shell length is 24 mm.

Habitat 
The minimum recorded depth for this species is 0 m.; maximum recorded depth is 0 m.

References

Littorinidae
Gastropods described in 1847